The Men's 200 Butterfly event at the 11th FINA World Aquatics Championships was swum on 26 – 27 July 2005 in Montreal, Quebec, Canada. The Preliminary and Semifinal heats were on 26 July; the final was held on 27 July.

As the Championships were swum in a long course pool, this race consisted of 4 lengths of the pool, butterfly.

At the start of the event, the existing World (WR) and Championships records were:
1:53.93, Michael Phelps ( USA), Barcelona, Spain, 22 July 2003.

Results

Final

Semifinals

Preliminaries

References
Worlds 2005 results: Men's 200m Butterfly Heats, from OmegaTiming.com (official timer of the 2005 Worlds); Retrieved 2011-01-21.
Worlds 2005 results: Men's 200m Butterfly Semifinals, from OmegaTiming.com (official timer of the 2005 Worlds); Retrieved 2011-01-21.
Worlds 2005 results: Men's 200m Butterfly Finals, from OmegaTiming.com (official timer of the 2005 Worlds); Retrieved 2011-01-21.

Swimming at the 2005 World Aquatics Championships